Soňa Bernardová (born 2 February 1976) is a Czech synchronized swimmer who competed in five Olympiades from 2000 to 2016.

Bernadová also participated in several World and European Championships in all disciplines.

References 

1976 births
Living people
Czech synchronized swimmers
Olympic synchronized swimmers of the Czech Republic
Synchronized swimmers at the 2000 Summer Olympics
Synchronized swimmers at the 2004 Summer Olympics
Synchronized swimmers at the 2008 Summer Olympics
Synchronized swimmers at the 2012 Summer Olympics
Synchronized swimmers at the 2016 Summer Olympics
Synchronized swimmers at the 2015 World Aquatics Championships
Synchronized swimmers at the 2013 World Aquatics Championships
Synchronized swimmers at the 2011 World Aquatics Championships
Synchronized swimmers at the 2009 World Aquatics Championships
Synchronized swimmers at the 2007 World Aquatics Championships
Synchronized swimmers at the 2005 World Aquatics Championships
Synchronized swimmers at the 2003 World Aquatics Championships
Sportspeople from Brno